Alfredo Romero may refer to:
 Alfredo Romero (b. 1972), Puerto Rican athlete.
 Alfredo Romero (b. 1969) Venezuelan lawyer.